Wangping Town is a town that stands within the eastern side of Mentougou District, Beijing, China. It borders Miaofengshan Town in its northeast, Dongxinfang Subdistrict and Longquan Town in its southeast, Yongding Town and Datai Subdistrict in its south, and Yanchi Town in its northwest. Its population was 7,013 as of 2020.

History

Administrative Divisions 
In the year 2021, Wangping Town was divided into 20 subdivisions, 4 of them were communities and the other 16 were villages:

See also 

 List of township-level divisions of Beijing

References 

Mentougou District
Towns in Beijing
Areas of Beijing